Taptykovo (Taptıq) is a rural locality (a selo) in Taptykovsky Selsoviet, Ufimsky District, Bashkortostan, Russia. The population was 734 as of 2010. There are 35 streets.

Geography 
Taptykovo is located 25 km southwest of Ufa (the district's administrative centre) by road. Glumilino is the nearest rural locality.

References 

Rural localities in Ufimsky District